Makham Luang is a tambon (subdistrict) of San Pa Tong District, in Chiang Mai Province, Thailand. In 2020 it had a total population of 6,317 people.

Administration

Central administration
The tambon is subdivided into 9 administrative villages (muban).

Local administration
The area of the subdistrict is shared by 3 local governments.
the subdistrict municipality (Thesaban Tambon) Ban Klang (เทศบาลตำบลบ้านกลาง)
the subdistrict municipality (Thesaban Tambon) San Pa Tong (เทศบาลตำบลสันป่าตอง)
the subdistrict administrative organization (SAO) Makham Luang (องค์การบริหารส่วนตำบลมะขามหลวง)

References

External links
Thaitambon.com on Makham Luang

Tambon of Chiang Mai province
Populated places in Chiang Mai province